The WYSIWYG Film Festival (which stands for What You See Is What You Get) is an annual Christian film festival held in San Francisco, California. It was founded in 1999 by Richard Gazowsky.

Awards

Films of The Year
 2004: The Passion of the Christ
 2005: Diary of a Mad Black Woman

Best Feature Films
 2004: Flywheel
 2005: The Second Chance

Best Documentaries
 2003: Save Them!: The Life of Paul Rader

Best Dramatic Film
 2004: 'Home Beyond the Sun

Best Foreign Films
 2005: Kaibigan

References

External links
Official website
WYSIWYG Film Festival at the Internet Movie Database

Christian film festivals